Dagisthaeus (Dagisthaîos) was a 6th-century Eastern Roman military commander, probably of Gothic origin, in the service of the emperor Justinian I. 

Dagisthaeus was possibly a descendant of the Ostrogothic chieftain Dagistheus. In 548, Dagisthaeus, still a young officer, was magister militum per Armeniam and commanded a force of 7,000 Romans and 1,000 Tzani sent to recapture the Euxine fortress of Petra, in Lazica, from a Sassanid Persian force during the Lazic War. Dagisthaeus put Petra under siege, but, according to the contemporary historian Procopius, acted in an incompetent manner. He was so confident in victory that he wrote to Justinian, indicating what rewards he thought he and his brother deserved. Dagisthaeus failed in his task, however, and had to flee before a relieving Sassanid army towards the Phasis river, without giving orders to his men. After that, Dagisthaeus, joined by the Lazi under King Gubazes, was able to defeat two Persian field armies in Lazica, one under the command of Phabrizus on the Phasis and the other under Chorianes near the river Hippis. Nevertheless, the Lazi held Dagisthaeus responsible for his failure at Petra and denounced him before Justinian, who had him placed in detention and replaced with Bessas in 549. 

Around 551, Dagisthaeus was released from custody and sent to fight against the Goths to Italy under the command of Narses. He was one of the commanders of the right flank of the Roman army at the battle of Busta Gallorum against the Ostrogoths of Totila and later played a decisive role in the reconquest of Rome. Procopius remarked that while Bessas had lost Rome and recovered Petra, Dagisthaeus had failed at Petra but reconquered Rome.

References 

6th-century Byzantine people of Gothic descent
Magistri militum
Generals of Justinian I
Gothic warriors
People of the Roman–Sasanian Wars
People of the Gothic War (535–554)
Lazic War